Atanasije is the Serbian variant of the Greek name Athanasios. Diminutives of the name include Atanas and Tanasko. It may refer to:

Atanasije II Gavrilović (d. 1752), Serbian Patriarch (1747–52)
Athanasius I of Ohrid (fl. 1596–1615), Archbishop of Ohrid (1596–98)
Atanasije (scribe) (1200–1265), Serbian monk-scribe
Tanasko Rajić (1754–1815), Serbian Revolutionary
Atanasije Stojković (1773–1832), Serbian writer and educator
Atanasije Jevtić (1938–2021), Serbian Orthodox bishop and theologian
Atanasije Nikolić (1803–1882), first rector of the Belgrade Lyceum
Atanasije Antonijević, Serbian archpriest

See also
Atanasijević, patronymic

Further reading

Serbian masculine given names